Angelina Jolie wore a white satin dress with a plunging neckline designed by Marc Bouwer at the 76th Academy Awards on February 29, 2004. It has been described in subsequent years by fashion and celebrity publications as a memorable and stylish selection that was reminiscent of classical Hollywood style. It was the second time that Jolie wore a Marc Bouwer dress to the Oscars. In 2000 she accepted her Oscar for Girl, Interrupted in a frock designed by Bouwer.

Critical reception to the dress focused on the material and color, describing both as difficult to wear stylishly. Most critics agreed that the look was a success for Jolie, and comparisons were drawn to several classic Hollywood stars, including Rita Hayworth, Jean Harlow, and especially Marilyn Monroe. The dress's minimalism and classic aesthetic has consistently been referred to as a defining moment for Jolie's style.

Cosmopolitan magazine cited the dress as one of the Best Oscar dresses of all time, saying, "Angie's one of very few people who can rock this material and this color — both being mercilessly unforgiving. But the dress drapes on her curves and shows off her assets in all the right ways." In 2019, Harper's Bazaar named it one of the 100 best red carpet dresses.

The dress was one of twenty-five famous red carpet dresses used in a photo shoot celebrating the 25th anniversary of InStyle magazine.

See also
 List of individual dresses

References

2000s fashion
Outfits worn at the Academy Awards ceremonies
2004 clothing
2004 in fashion
Angelina Jolie
Marc Bouwer, Jolie